{{DISPLAYTITLE:C17H28N2O3}}
The molecular formula C17H28N2O3 (molar mass: 308.41 g/mol) may refer to:

 Metabutoxycaine
 Oxybuprocaine, also known as benoxinate

Molecular formulas